Kukullaga is the southern terminus of line 3 of the Bilbao metro. The station is also served by Euskotren Trena commuter and regional rail services. The station is located in the neighborhood of Kukullaga, in the municipality of Etxebarri, which is part of the Bilbao metropolitan area. It is one of two metro stations in Etxebarri, the other one being Etxebarri. It opened on 8 April 2017.

During the planning and construction process, the station was referred to as Etxebarri-Norte and San Antonio-Etxebarri.

Station layout 

Kukullaga is an open-air station located at-grade in a neighbourhood with the same name, part of the municipality of Etxebarri. The station was designed by British architect Norman Foster The station can be accessed from the western side, facing Ametzola Park or from the eastern side using an inclined elevator that connects the station with the neighborhood of San Antonio, which is located at a higher altitude.

The station is composed of a crystal footbridge connecting the entrances with the platforms. There has been criticism over the crystal bridge getting too hot during sunny days.

Access 

   Ametzola Park
   29 Euskal Herria St. (Bº Kukullaga)
   4, Church access (Bº San Antonio)

Services 
Unlike the two other lines of the Bilbao metro system (which are operated by Metro Bilbao S.A.), line 3 is operated by Euskotren, which runs it as part of the Euskotren Trena network. Trains from the Bilbao-San Sebastián, Txorierri and Urdaibai lines of the network run through line 3.

After the closure of the railtrack section between Kukullaga and Bilbao-Atxuri, the corridor between the neighborhood of Atxuri and the Kukullaga station will be served by an extension of the Bilbao tram, which will include the adaptation of Bilbao-Atxuri, Bolueta and Kukullaga stations to include platforms and tracks adapted to a tramway service. The tramway extension to Bolueta opened in March 2022, but the tram won't reach Kukullaga until a new depot for Euskotren's material is built, since the tracks the tram would use have been adapted as a temporary depot.

Gallery

References

External links
 

Line 3 (Bilbao metro) stations
Euskotren Trena stations
Railway stations in Spain opened in 2017
2017 establishments in the Basque Country (autonomous community)